Hugo's Family Marketplace is a family-owned chain of supermarket grocery stores located in the U.S. states of North Dakota and Minnesota.  It was founded by Hugo and Dorothy Magnuson in 1939. Hugo's is headquartered in the city of Grand Forks, North Dakota. The chain's stores have been supplied by the Nash Finch Company since 1939.  Nash Finch was once headquartered in Grand Forks, but moved to Minneapolis, Minnesota in 1919.

History
Hugo Magnuson, a former mayor of Grand Forks, opened his first grocery store, the Pure Food Market, in Grand Forks. Magnuson's grocery stores carried the Piggly Wiggly name for a period of years, before switching to the current "Hugo's" name.

After Hugo's retirement, his son Curtis Magnuson became president of the chain. Hugo died in 2003 at the age of 102. Curtis died in 2007 at the age of 66. The chain is now run by Curtis' daughter, Kristi Magnuson-Nelson.

Today, the chain operates ten stores exclusively under the "Hugo's" name.   The store's mascot is a cartoon of a smiling blonde boy named Seemore for Seemore Savings and the slogan is "More low prices, more great stuff, when you go to Hugo's".

The chain also operates Seven liquor stores in North Dakota and Minnesota under the banner Hugo's Wine and Spirits.

Locations

North Dakota
Grand Forks (five locations)
Jamestown
Grafton

Minnesota
East Grand Forks
Crookston
Fosston
Park Rapids
Thief River Falls

External links
Hugo's website

Supermarkets of the United States
Companies based in North Dakota
Retail companies established in 1939
1939 establishments in North Dakota
Family-owned companies of the United States